Danilo Fioravanti (23 August 1913 – 4 May 1997) was an Italian gymnast. He competed at the 1936 and 1948 Olympics and finished in fifth place with the Italian team. His best individual result was 12th place on the vault in 1936.

References

1913 births
2007 deaths
Gymnasts at the 1936 Summer Olympics
Gymnasts at the 1948 Summer Olympics
Olympic gymnasts of Italy
Italian male artistic gymnasts